Ocotepec is a town and one of the 119 Municipalities of Chiapas, in southern Mexico.

As of 2010, the municipality had a total population of 11,878, up from 9,271 as of 2005. It covers an area of 59.6 km².

As of 2010, the town of Ocotepec had a population of 4,663. Other than the town of Ocotepec, the municipality had 39 localities, the largest of which (with 2010 populations in parentheses) was: San Pablo Huacano (1,427), classified as rural.

References

Municipalities of Chiapas